Ulvesund Lighthouse is a coastal lighthouse located in Kinn Municipality in Vestland county, Norway.  It is located on the mainland coast along the Ulvesundet strait.

History
It was first lit in 1870 and automated in 1985. The lighthouse is owned by the Norwegian Coastal Administration, and is used as cultural cafe and lodging house.

See also

 List of lighthouses in Norway
 Lighthouses in Norway

References

External links
 Norsk Fyrhistorisk Forening 
 Picture of Ulvesund Lighthouse

Lighthouses completed in 1870
Lighthouses in Vestland
Kinn